The Chief of the General Staff of the Egyptian Armed Forces is second in command after the Minister of Defense and the President. He usually holds the second highest military rank. Commanders of the Navy, Air Force and Air Defense Forces are under his command.

List of chiefs
The following is a list of chiefs of the General Staff of Egypt since the Egyptian revolution of 1952.

* Incumbent's time in office last updated: .

Timeline

See also

 Egyptian Armed Forces
 Ministry of Defense (Egypt)

References

Egyptian military-related lists